Bank1 (B-cell scaffold protein with ankyrin repeats 1) is a protein-encoding human gene located on chromosome 4 (4q24. Adaptor protein that binds the proteins of the family SCR with Calcium channels in the LB.
.

References

Genes on human chromosome 4